The Three Tenors in Concert 1994 is a live album by José Carreras, Plácido Domingo and Luciano Pavarotti with conductor Zubin Mehta. The album was recorded on July 16, 1994, at the Three Tenors concert in Los Angeles with the Los Angeles Philharmonic and the chorus of the Los Angeles Opera on the night before the 1994 FIFA World Cup Final. An estimated 1.3 billion viewers watched the concert as a television broadcast special across the world.

This concert has been released on home video formats, and re-released on Streaming Video formats on 2019.

Reception

The AllMusic reviewer wrote that the singers displayed "vitality and pizzazz" during the concert. The reviewer remarked on the oddity of a concert by classical musicians held in a sports stadium, but nonetheless believed that the popularity of the tenors made the venue less "ludicrous". The reviewer also found them to be in "fine form" in regard to their singing and singled out certain numbers for praise: Domingo's "Granada," Carreras' "O souverain, o juge, o père," and Pavarotti's "Nessun dorma", as well as "La donna è mobile" and "Libiamo ne' lieti calici", which all three men sang together.

Track listing

Tracks 7–10 are a medley titled "A Tribute to Hollywood", and Tracks 14–25 are a medley titled "Around the World", both arranged and orchestrated by Lalo Schifrin.

Omissions
Not included in the album were these three numbers sung (between 11 and 12 above) at the concert:

Charts

Weekly charts

Year-end chart

Sales and certifications

Personnel

José Carreras, vocals
Plácido Domingo, vocals
Luciano Pavarotti, vocals
Zubin Mehta, conductor
Los Angeles Philharmonic
Los Angeles Opera Chorus
Lalo Schifrin, arranger
David Hewitt (Remote Recording's Silver Truck), sound recorder

See also
Carreras Domingo Pavarotti in Concert (the first Three Tenors concert recording)
The Three Tenors: Paris 1998

References

External links
"How The 3 Tenors Sang The Hits And Changed The Game." NPR. July 16, 2014.

1994 live albums
1994 classical albums
The Three Tenors albums